Barzakh is an album by Tunisian oud player Anouar Brahem recorded in 1990 and released on the ECM label.

Reception
The Allmusic review by Stephen Cook awarded the album 4½ stars stating "This is a great title for fans of both international music and jazz."

Track listing
All compositions by Anouar Brahem except as indicated
 "Raf Raf" - 3:33   
 "Barzakh" (Anouar Brahem, Bechir Selmi) - 11:02   
 "Sadir" - 6:32   
 "Ronda" - 3:07   
 "Hou" - 1:33   
 "Sarandib" - 2:48   
 "Souga" (Lassad Hosni) - 2:07   
 "Parfum de Gitane" - 4:16   
 "Bou Naouara" (Hosni) - 2:22   
 "Kerkenah" - 7:30   
 "La Nuit des Jeux" - 5:29   
 "Le Belvédère Assiege" - 4:14   
 "Qaf" - 1:43  
Recorded at Rainbow Studio in Oslo, Norway in September 1990

Personnel
Anouar Brahem - oud
Béchir Selmi - violin
Lassad Hosni - percussion

References

1991 albums
ECM Records albums
Anouar Brahem albums
Albums produced by Manfred Eicher